The earliest reference to the name Zhuo Yin is traced to the Ming Dynasty (1368–1644). Since the traditional English translation (Clumsy Mystic) does not reflect the wide semantic field of the name, the topic of its origin has generated some academic interest in the historical, linguistical and philosophical circles. This article attempts to summarize the findings.

Clumsy – 拙 (zhuō) 

Clumsiness in the Chinese culture has always been the attribute of a great skill. The Tao Te Ching (道德經), written around 6th century BC by the mystic, philosopher and poet Lao-Tzu (老子), says this in Chapter 45:

Chen Jiru (陳繼儒), a painter, philosopher and calligrapher during the Ming Dynasty in his work “Solitary Thoughts by a Small Window” (小窗幽) gives this advice:

Mystic – 隱 (yǐn) 
The character 隱, used as a noun, means mystery, hidden matters, secret, hint, thinking, hermit or recluse. Researchers believe that Yin in name Zhuo Yin comes from a poem by the Tang Dynasty poet Liu Cang (刘沧) :

Some linguists, however, argue that the last line of the poem was originally “Find joy in gathering firewood, and yoga and in friends”, because  characters 瑜 (瑜伽, yoga) and 漁 (fishing) are both spelled yú and are homonyms in Mandarin. The error was introduced later by scribes who were unfamiliar with yoga, during the Qing Dynasty when Tang poetry anthologies were being compiled.

The Seal 
The official seal of Clumsy Mystic consists of two vertically oriented characters Zhuo and Yin written in the traditional Great Seal script (大篆) in the Zhuwen style (朱文, lit. “red characters”) that imprints the characters in red ink.|

References 

Chinese traditional music